Zafarabad (also Romanized as Z̧afarābād; also known as Sardārābād) is a village in Takmaran Rural District, Sarhad District, Shirvan County, North Khorasan Province, Iran. At the 2006 census, its population was 790, in 173 families.

References 

Populated places in Shirvan County